This article contains lists of those nations that have won a water polo world medal, referring to any of the men's and women's tournament at the Olympic Games, men's and women's tournament at the FINA World Aquatics Championships, men's and women's FINA Water Polo World Cup, and men's and women's FINA Water Polo World League.

Men's water polo world medalists
For the making of these lists, results from following world tournaments are consulted:

 FINA: Fédération internationale de natation
 IOC: International Olympic Committee

Medals for the unofficial events are NOT counted. Medals earned by athletes from defunct National Olympic Committees (NOCs) or historical teams are NOT merged with the results achieved by their immediate successor states. The International Olympic Committee (IOC) does NOT combine medals of these nations or teams.

1900–2001
Legend
  – Winning three or more gold medals in a row, excluding the FINA World League
 Team† – Defunct team

2002–present
Legend
  – Winning three or more gold medals in a row, excluding the FINA World League
  – Winning five or more gold medals in a row, including the FINA World League
 Team† – Defunct team

Team statistics

World medals by team

Last updated: 9 August 2021 (after the 2020 Summer Olympics).

Legend
 Team† – Defunct team

{| class="wikitable sortable" style="text-align: center; font-size: 90%; margin-left: 1em;"
|-
! rowspan="2" | Men's team !! colspan="3" | OG !! rowspan="2" class="unsortable" | !! colspan="3" | WCH !! rowspan="2" class="unsortable" | !! colspan="3" | WCp !! rowspan="2" class="unsortable" | !! colspan="3" | WL
|-
! style="background-color: gold;" | G !! style="background-color: silver;" | S !! style="background-color: #cc9966;" | B !! style="background-color: gold;" | G !! style="background-color: silver;" | S !! style="background-color: #cc9966;" | B !! style="background-color: gold;" | G !! style="background-color: silver;" | S !! style="background-color: #cc9966;" | B !! style="background-color: gold;" | G !! style="background-color: silver;" | S !! style="background-color: #cc9966;" | B
|-
| style="text-align: left;" |  || 0 || 0 || 0 || || 0 || 0 || 0 || || 0 || 1 || 1 || || 0 || 0 || 3
|- style="background-color: #ccffcc;"
| style="text-align: left;" |  || 0 || 4 || 2 || || 0 || 0 || 0 || || 0 || 0 || 0 || || 0 || 0 || 0
|-
| style="text-align: left;" |  || 0 || 0 || 0 || || 0 || 0 || 0 || || 0 || 0 || 0 || || 0 || 0 || 1
|- style="background-color: #ccffcc;"
| style="text-align: left;" |  || 1 || 2 || 0 || || 2 || 1 || 4 || || 0 || 1 || 1 || || 1 || 3 || 3
|-
| style="text-align: left;" |  || 0 || 0 || 0 || || 0 || 0 || 0 || || 0 || 0 || 1 || || 0 || 0 || 0
|- style="background-color: #ccffcc;"
| style="text-align: left;" |  || 1 || 0 || 3 || || 0 || 0 || 0 || || 0 || 0 || 0 || || 0 || 0 || 0
|-
| style="text-align: left;" |  || 1 || 2 || 0 || || 0 || 0 || 0 || || 0 || 0 || 0 || || 0 || 0 || 1
|- style="background-color: #ccffcc;"
| style="text-align: left;" |  || 4 || 0 || 0 || || 0 || 0 || 0 || || 0 || 0 || 0 || || 0 || 0 || 0
|-
| style="text-align: left;" |  || 0 || 1 || 0 || || 0 || 0 || 2 || || 0 || 1 || 0 || || 0 || 0 || 4
|- style="background-color: #ccffcc;"
| style="text-align: left;" |  || 9 || 3 || 4 || || 3 || 7 || 1 || || 4 || 4 || 2 || || 2 || 5 || 1
|-
| style="text-align: left;" |  || 3 || 2 || 3 || || 4 || 2 || 1 || || 1 || 3 || 1 || || 0 || 3 || 1
|- style="background-color: #ccffcc;"
| style="text-align: left;" |  || 0 || 0 || 0 || || 0 || 1 || 0 || || 0 || 0 || 0 || || 3 || 1 || 2
|-
! rowspan="2" data-sort-value="N" | Men's team !! colspan="3" | OG !! rowspan="2" | !! colspan="3" | WCH !! rowspan="2" | !! colspan="3" | WCp !! rowspan="2" | !! colspan="3" | WL
|-
! style="background-color: gold;" | G !! style="background-color: silver;" | S !! style="background-color: #cc9966;" | B !! style="background-color: gold;" | G !! style="background-color: silver;" | S !! style="background-color: #cc9966;" | B !! style="background-color: gold;" | G !! style="background-color: silver;" | S !! style="background-color: #cc9966;" | B !! style="background-color: gold;" | G !! style="background-color: silver;" | S !! style="background-color: #cc9966;" | B
|-
| style="text-align: left;" |  || 0 || 0 || 2 || || 0 || 0 || 0 || || 0 || 0 || 0 || || 0 || 0 || 0
|- style="background-color: #ccffcc;"
| style="text-align: left;" |  || 0 || 1 || 1 || || 0 || 0 || 2 || || 1 || 0 || 1 || || 1 || 0 || 0
|-
| style="text-align: left;" |  || 2 || 0 || 2 || || 2 || 1 || 1 || || 2 || 0 || 1 || || 10 || 0 || 1
|- style="background-color: #ccffcc;"
| style="text-align: left;" | † || 0 || 1 || 0 || || 1 || 0 || 1 || || 1 || 0 || 0 || || 2 || 1 || 0
|-
| style="text-align: left;" | † || 2 || 2 || 3 || || 2 || 1 || 1 || || 2 || 1 || 0 || || 0 || 0 || 0
|- style="background-color: #ccffcc;"
| style="text-align: left;" |  || 1 || 1 || 0 || || 2 || 4 || 1 || || 0 || 0 || 5 || || 0 || 3 || 1
|-
| style="text-align: left;" |  || 0 || 1 || 2 || || 0 || 0 || 0 || || 0 || 0 || 0 || || 0 || 0 || 0
|- style="background-color: #ccffcc;"
| style="text-align: left;" | † || 0 || 0 || 1 || || 0 || 0 || 0 || || 0 || 0 || 0 || || 0 || 0 || 0
|-
| style="text-align: left;" |  || 0 || 3 || 3 || || 0 || 0 || 0 || || 2 || 2 || 0 || || 0 || 3 || 1
|- style="background-color: #ccffcc;"
| style="text-align: left;" | † || 0 || 0 || 1 || || 0 || 0 || 1 || || 1 || 1 || 1 || || 0 || 0 || 0
|-
| style="text-align: left;" | † || 3 || 4 || 0 || || 2 || 0 || 2 || || 2 || 2 || 1 || || 0 || 0 || 0
|- style="background-color: #ccffcc;"
| style="text-align: left;" data-sort-value="Yugoslavia, FR" | † || 0 || 0 || 1 || || 0 || 1 || 1 || || 0 || 0 || 1 || || 0 || 0 || 0
|-
! Totals (24 men's teams) !! 27 !! 27 !! 28 !! !! 18 !! 18 !! 18 !! !! 16 !! 16 !! 16 !! !! 19 !! 19 !! 19
|}

Medal table by team
The following tables are pre-sorted by number of gold medals (in descending order), number of silver medals (in descending order), number of bronze medals (in descending order), name of the team (in ascending order), respectively. Last updated: 9 August 2021 (after the 2020 Summer Olympics).

Legend
 Team† – Defunct team

National teams by decade
The following tables are pre-sorted by decade (in ascending order), total number of medals (in descending order), number of gold medals (in descending order), number of silver medals (in descending order), three-letter country code (in ascending order), respectively. Last updated: 9 August 2021 (after the 2020 Summer Olympics).

Legend
 Team† – Defunct team

Consecutive gold medals
Last updated: 9 August 2021 (after the 2020 Summer Olympics).

Legend
 Team† – Defunct team

Confederation statistics
National teams by confederation
Last updated: 9 August 2021 (after the 2020 Summer Olympics).

Legend
 Team† – Defunct team

Medal table by confederation
The following tables are pre-sorted by number of gold medals (in descending order), number of silver medals (in descending order), number of bronze medals (in descending order), name of the confederation (in ascending order), respectively. Last updated: 9 August 2021 (after the 2020 Summer Olympics).

Women's water polo world medalists
For the making of these lists, results from following world tournaments are consulted:

 FINA: Fédération internationale de natation
 IOC: International Olympic Committee

Medals for the unofficial events are NOT counted. Medals earned by athletes from defunct National Olympic Committees (NOCs) or historical teams are NOT merged with the results achieved by their immediate successor states. The International Olympic Committee (IOC) does NOT combine medals of these nations or teams. 

1979–2003
Legend
  – Winning three or more gold medals in a row, excluding the FINA World League

2004–present
Legend
  – Winning three or more gold medals in a row, excluding the FINA World League
  – Winning five or more gold medals in a row, including the FINA World League

Team statistics
World medals by team

Last updated: 9 August 2021 (after the 2020 Summer Olympics).

Medal table by team
The following tables are pre-sorted by number of gold medals (in descending order), number of silver medals (in descending order), number of bronze medals (in descending order), name of the team (in ascending order), respectively. Last updated: 9 August 2021 (after the 2020 Summer Olympics).

National teams by decade
The following tables are pre-sorted by decade (in ascending order), total number of medals (in descending order), number of gold medals (in descending order), number of silver medals (in descending order), three-letter country code (in ascending order), respectively.Last updated: 9 August 2021 (after the 2020 Summer Olympics).

Consecutive gold medals
Last updated: 9 August 2021 (after the 2020 Summer Olympics).

Confederation statistics
National teams by confederation
Last updated: 9 August 2021 (after the 2020 Summer Olympics).

Medal table by confederation
The following tables are pre-sorted by number of gold medals (in descending order), number of silver medals (in descending order), number of bronze medals (in descending order), name of the confederation (in ascending order), respectively. Last updated: 9 August 2021 (after the 2020 Summer Olympics).

Overall statistics
Medal table by nation
The following tables are pre-sorted by number of gold medals (in descending order), number of silver medals (in descending order), number of bronze medals (in descending order), name of the nation (in ascending order), respectively. Last updated: 9 August 2021 (after the 2020 Summer Olympics).

Legend
 Nation◊ – Nation that won medals in both the men's and women's tournaments
 Nation† – Defunct nation

National teams by confederation
Last updated: 9 August 2021 (after the 2020 Summer Olympics).

Legend
 Team''† – Defunct team

Medal table by confederation
The following tables are pre-sorted by number of gold medals (in descending order), number of silver medals (in descending order), number of bronze medals (in descending order), name of the confederation (in ascending order), respectively. Last updated: 9 August 2021 (after the 2020 Summer Olympics).

See also
 Water polo at the Summer Olympics
 Water polo at the World Aquatics Championships
 FINA Water Polo World Cup
 FINA Women's Water Polo World Cup
 FINA Water Polo World League
 Major achievements in water polo by nation
 FINA Water Polo World Rankings

Notes

References

External links
 Water polo | fina.org – Official FINA website

 *
World medalists